Galium aparine, with common names including cleavers, clivers, catchweed and sticky willy among others, is an annual, herbaceous plant of the family Rubiaceae.

Names
Galium aparine is known by a variety of common names in English. They include hitchhikers, cleavers, clivers, bedstraw, (small) goosegrass (not to be confused with other plants known as goosegrass), catchweed, stickyweed, sticky bob, stickybud, stickyback, sticky molly, robin-run-the-hedge, sticky willy, sticky willow, stickyjack, stickeljack, grip grass, sticky grass, bobby buttons, whippysticks, velcro plant, and bort.

Galium is Dioscorides’ name for the plant. It is derived from the Greek word for ‘milk’, because the flowers of Galium verum were used to curdle milk in cheese making. Aparine is a name used by Theophrastus. It means 'clinging' or 'seizing', and is derived from the Greek   'lay hold of, seize', itself coming from  'from' +  'pull to lift'.

Description
Cleavers are annuals with creeping straggling stems which branch and grow along the ground and over other plants. They attach themselves with the small hooked hairs which grow out of the stems and leaves. The stems can reach up to three feet or longer, and are angular or square shaped. The leaves are simple, narrowly oblanceolate to linear, and borne in whorls of six to eight.

Cleavers have tiny, star-shaped, white to greenish flowers, which emerge from early spring to summer. The flowers are clustered in groups of two or three, and are borne out of the leaf axils. The corolla bears 4 petals.  The globular fruits are burrs which grow one to three seeds clustered together; they are covered with hooked hairs which cling to animal fur and human clothing, aiding in seed dispersal.

Distribution
The species is native to a wide region of Europe, North Africa and Asia from Britain and the Canary Islands to Japan. It is now naturalized throughout most of the United States, Canada, Mexico, Central America, South America, Australia, New Zealand, some oceanic islands and scattered locations in Africa. Whether it is native to North America is a question of some debate, but it is considered to be native there in most literature.   It is considered a noxious weed in many places.

Effects on the body
For some people, skin contact with Galium aparine causes an unpleasant localized rash known as contact dermatitis.

Chemistry
Chemical constituents of Galium aparine include: iridoid glycosides such as asperulosidic acid and 10-deacetylasperulosidic acid; asperuloside; monotropein; aucubin; alkaloids such as caffeine; flavonoids; coumarins; organic acids such as citric acid and a red dye; phenolics such as phenolic acid; and anthraquinone derivatives such as the aldehyde nordamnacanthal (1,3-dihydroxy-anthraquinone-2-al).

Edibility
Galium aparine is edible. The leaves and stems of the plant can be cooked as a leaf vegetable if gathered before the fruits appear. However, the numerous small hooks which cover the plant and give it its clinging nature can make it less palatable if eaten raw. Geese frequently consume G. aparine, hence one of its other common names, "goosegrass". Cleavers are in the same family as coffee. The fruits of cleavers have often been dried and roasted, and then used as a coffee substitute which contains less caffeine.

Folk medicine
Poultices and washes made from cleavers were traditionally used to treat a variety of skin ailments, light wounds and burns. As a pulp, it has been used to relieve poisonous bites and stings. To make a poultice, the entire plant is used, and applied directly to the affected area.
Making a tea with the dried leaves is most common. It can be brewed hot or cold. For a cold infusion, steep in water and refrigerate for 24–48 hours.

Other uses
Dioscorides reported that ancient Greek shepherds would use the barbed stems of cleavers to make a "rough sieve", which could be used to strain milk. Carl Linnaeus later reported the same usage in Sweden, a tradition that is still practiced in modern times.

In Europe, the dried, matted foliage of the plant was once used to stuff mattresses. Several of the bedstraws were used for this purpose because the clinging hairs cause the branches to stick together, which enables the mattress filling to maintain a uniform thickness. The roots of cleavers can be used to make a permanent red dye.

Children in the British Isles have historically used cleavers as a form of entertainment. The tendency for the leaves and stems to adhere to clothing is used in various forms of play, such as mock camouflage and various pranks.

Ecology
The plant can be found growing in hedges and waste places, limestone scree and as a garden weed.

G. aparine prefers moist soils and can exist in areas with poor drainage. It reportedly flourishes in heavy soils with above-average nitrogen and phosphorus content, and prefers soils with a pH value between 5.5 and 8.0. G. aparine is often found in post-fire plant communities in the United States, likely developing from onsite seed and therefore rendering controlled burns as an ineffective means of removing G. aparine in areas where it is considered a noxious weed.

Many insects feed on cleavers including aphids and spittlebugs.

The anthraquinone aldehyde nordamnacanthal (1,3-dihydroxy-anthraquinone-2-al) present in G. aparine has an antifeedant activity against Spodoptera litura, the Oriental leafworm moth, a species which is considered an agricultural pest. The mite Cecidophyes rouhollahi can be found on G. aparine.

Photos

References

Further reading

 Edible and Medicinal Plants of the West, Gregory L. Tilford, 
 Altervista Flora Italiana

aparine
Flora of Europe
Flora of Africa
Flora of Asia
Plants described in 1753
Taxa named by Carl Linnaeus
Medicinal plants of Asia
Medicinal plants of Europe